Darshan is a 1967 East Pakistani film directed by Rehman, who also played the lead role in it opposite Shabnam.  Darshan was released on 8 September 1967 in East Pakistan and cinemas of Lahore, Pakistan.

Plot summary
The film revolves around romantic tale of rich lady with a guesthouse owner.

Film reception
In October 2015, the film was screened at Lok Virsa Museum in Pakistan. The film is known for its blockbuster music composed by Bashir Ahmed on his own written lyrics and he also sang them as a playback singer. 

This film was a box office hit.

Cast 
 Shabnam
 Rehman
 Reshma
 Fateh Lohani

Popular film songs
Yeh samaa pyara pyara, yeh hawaein thandi thandi, Sung by Mala
Youn akela mujhay chorr kar, Sung by Bashir Ahmad
Hum chale chorr kar teri mehfil sanam, Sung by Bashir Ahmad
Yeh mausam, yeh mast nazaray, pyar karo tau inn se karo, Sung by Bashir Ahmad

References

External links

1967 films
Pakistani black-and-white films
1960s Urdu-language films
Urdu-language Pakistani films